Basshunter is a Swedish singer, record producer and DJ. He has released 20 music videos, five lyric videos, two remix videos, one video megamix and five promotional video singles, and has made a guest appearance in one music video. Basshunter appeared in four short films, twelve television shows and one commercial.

From his second album LOL (2006), Basshunter released music videos for the singles "Boten Anna", "Vi sitter i Ventrilo och spelar DotA", "Vifta med händerna" and "Jingle Bells". Carl-Johan Westregård and Kim Parrot directed the music videos for "Boten Anna" and "Vi sitter i Ventrilo och spelar DotA". A second version of the music video for the former was made. In 2007, a music video for the reissue of "Vi sitter i Ventrilo och spelar DotA" titled "DotA" was released.

The deluxe edition of Basshunter's third studio album Now You're Gone – The Album (2008) includes the single "Walk on Water" which had been released also as a promotional video single. A special version of Now You're Gone – The Album released in New Zealand and Poland contains a DVD that comprises nine Basshunter music videos, including "Now You're Gone", "All I Ever Wanted", "Angel in the Night" and "I Miss You" – all directed by Alex Herron. For his fourth studio album Bass Generation (2009), Basshunter released the music videos for "Every Morning" and "I Promised Myself", both directed by Alex Herron. A series of music videos with Aylar Lie received media attention. "Now You're Gone" became the most-viewed from the British YouTube videos in 2008 and third most-viewed YouTube video with 65 millions of views in 2009.

The release of Basshunter's fifth album Calling Time (2013) was preceded by the release of music videos for its singles "Saturday", "Northern Light"—both directed by Alex Herron—and "Dream on the Dancefloor". The music video for "Saturday" charted at number one in Poland. In 2011, he appeared in Arash's music video for "Melody". He appeared on the Maspalomas Pride 2012 box-set containing live recordings of various artists. The music videos for "Crash & Burn" and "Calling Time" were later released. Gareth Evans directed the music videos for "Dream on the Dancefloor" and "Calling Time", and "Crash & Burn" was directed by Farzad Bayat. In 2018, Basshunter released a lyrics video for "Masterpiece".

Basshunter has appeared on television, including the ninth episode of the 23rd season of Never Mind the Buzzcocks, the seventh season of Celebrity Big Brother and a Rock and Pop celebrity episode of Weakest Link. He is also featured in a commercial for JME Data. In 2021 he appeared in Basshunter Dota Revival, Netflix's trailer for Dota: Dragon's Blood. The trailer shows Basshunter singing about playing Dota 2 and scenes from Dragon's Blood in between.

Music videos

As lead artist

Lyric videos

Remix videos

Guest appearances

Video megamixes

Promotional video singles

Albums

Studio albums

Guest appearances

Short films

Television

Commercials

Notes

References

External links
 

Videographies of Swedish artists
Videography